American heavy metal band Pantera released a series of EPs for the song "Walk" in 1993.

Walk (EP) 

Walk was released in Japan only, in 1993 by Atco Records. On May 16, 2012, the EP was made available to purchase digitally in the United States for the first time.

This EP contains six songs. The first four are remixes from the Vulgar Display of Power album, while the last two are live tracks from Cowboys from Hell, recorded live at Foundations Forum in 1990. Those same live tracks were later re-issued in the 2010 reissue of the same album.

Based purely on length, this recording is considered an EP. The parallel releases, Walk Biomechanical and Walk Cervical, are singles, not EPs, owing to their total length.

While this was only a Japanese release, it was also released as disc three in the Driven Downunder Tour '94 Souvenir Collection box set in 1994.

Track listing

Walk Biomechanical 

Walk Biomechanical was released in 1993 by Atco Records. It contains four songs from Vulgar Display of Power. The first two are album versions, while the second two have been remixed and renamed by Justin Broadrick of Godflesh.

Track listing

Walk Live Material 

Walk Live Material was released in 1993 by Atco Records. It is a 12" vinyl only release.

This EP contains four songs. The first two are album tracks from Vulgar Display of Power, while the last two are live tracks from Cowboys from Hell.

The tagline on the back of the vinyl is "Recorded September 28th 1991, live at Moscow Monsters of Rock in front of a crowd of 500,000. Definitely no overdubs!"

Track listing

Walk Cervical 

Walk Cervical was released in 1993 by Atco Records. It contains four songs from Vulgar Display of Power. The first two are album versions, while the second two have been remixed and renamed by JG Thirlwell of Foetus.

Track listing

Personnel 
Pantera
Phil Anselmo – vocals
Rex Brown – bass
Dimebag Darrell – guitar
Vinnie Paul – drums

Other
JG Thirlwell – remixes
Justin Broadrick – remixes

References 

1993 EPs
Pantera albums
1993 live albums
Live EPs
1993 remix albums
Remix EPs
Atco Records EPs
Atco Records remix albums